Mendi Msimang (8 December 1928 – 3 December 2018) was the treasurer of the African National Congress from 1997 until 2012.

Biography 
From 1995 to 1998 he served as High Commissioner in London, England. He was married to former Minister of Health, Manto Tshabalala-Msimang, until her death in 2009. Msimang had been a member of the ANC Youth League and served as secretary to Walter Sisulu. He acted as the ANC's London representative in the 1960s.

References

1928 births
2018 deaths
Members of the African National Congress
People from Johannesburg
High Commissioners of South Africa to the United Kingdom